During World War II, the Waffen Grenadier Regiment of the SS (1st Romanian) was formed out of members of the Romanian 4th Infantry Division which had been refitting in German territory when Romania signed a ceasefire with the Soviet Union.

The regiment also included members of the Fascist Iron Guard, which always had a close relationship with the SS. It was attached to the III (Germanic) SS Panzer Corps and fought on the River Oder front until the beginning of March 1945. It was then transferred to the eastern approaches to Berlin where it was destroyed during the Soviet Berlin offensive which was launched on 16 April 1945. Most of the unit survived and escaped westward into captivity.

Construction battalion
It was hoped by the Germans that this unit would form the basis of a Waffen Grenadier Division of the SS (1st Romanian) and to that end a second regiment was formed. The Waffen Grenadier Regiment of the SS (2nd Romanian) began forming at Döllersheim in Austria. However, by this stage in the war there was no fuel for vehicles, little food, and no weapons or ammunition for the new regiment. In April 1945, the two battalions which had been formed were used as construction battalions.

Commanders
No. 1: SS-Sturmbannführer Gustav Wagner
No. 2: SS-Standartenführer Albert Ludwig

Order of battle
 Ist Battalion
 2nd Battalion

See also
 List of German divisions in World War II
 List of SS personnel
 List of Waffen-SS divisions

Foreign conscript units of the Waffen-SS
Military units and formations disestablished in 1945
Grenadier regiments